Chevithorne is a small village near Tiverton, Devon.  It lies three miles to the North East of Tiverton. 'Chenetorne' is identified in two entries of the Doomsday Book:
The first entry tells us the manor of Chevithorne, had a taxable value 0.6 geld units, and worth £2.3 to the lord in 1086. The holding was populated by 4 villagers. 2 smallholders. 8 slaves.
There was enough ploughland for 2 lord's plough teams. and 2 men's plough teams and had, in addition, 0.12 lord's lands. 8 acres of meadow. 15 acres in pasture. and 3 acres of woodland.
There were also 10 cattle and 60 sheep. The 'Lords' of this holding in 1086: are named as Alwin (who is also named as lord in 1066), and  Beatrix (the sister of Ralph of Pomeroy and William 'the goat').
Ralph de Pomeroy was Tenant-in-chief, He was a large land holder in Devon, and his brother William held several properties as both lord and Tenant-in-Chief.

The balance of the land was held by Baldwin,'the Sheriff', as Tenant in Chief, served by Rogo (son of Nigel) as lord. The holding included 3 villagers. 3 smallholders. 3 slaves; 5 ploughlands . 1 lord's plough teams. 0.5 men's plough teams, in addition to 0.12 acres of lord's lands. 11 acres in meadow, and 12 acres in pasture for 5 cattle. 16 pigs. 18 sheep. 6 goat. Plus 100 acres of woods for hunting. All valued to the lord, in 1086, at £1.

Major Buildings

The Church of St Thomas, the parish church, is a Victorian building of 1843 by Bejamin Ferrey.  It is of local red sandstone with a slate roof and in a Middle Pointed style.  The interior has memorial tablets to members of the Heathcoat-Amory family, local industrialists and landowners who lived at nearby Knightshayes Court.  The churchyard contains a memorial to Michael Heathcoat-Amory by the sculptor Eric Gill.  The church is a Grade II listed building.

The vicarage, behind the church, is by the Victorian architect William Burges and was commissioned by Sir John Heathcoat-Amory and constructed 1870-71.  The style is Burges's "unmistakable muscular Gothic."  The building is of one storey with a garret and a kitchen wing and cost £700.  Now a private house, the vicarage is also Grade II listed.

Chevithorne Barton is a manor house of the early 17th century, rebuilt in the 19th century and further remodelled for the Heathcoat-Amory's in 1930.  Of three storeys, it contains some original Jacobean platerwork and panelling.  The manor house is a Grade II* listed building. Michael Heathcoat Amory (born October 1941, died February 2016) created the arboretum there, and published  a catalogue entitled ''The Oaks of Chevithorne Barton.

Notes

References

External links

 Michael Heathcoat Amory (1941 - 2016)

Villages in Mid Devon District
Tiverton, Devon